André Joseph Launay  was a novelist, essayist, humourist and dramatist of French descent who wrote in English under the pen names André Launay, Drew Launay, Andrew Laurance and Drew Lamark.

He was the author of family dramas, psychic thrillers, humour and travel books published in the United Kingdom and in the US. Launay lived in Nerja, in the south of Spain until his death; He had three children: record producer Nick Launay, film director Matthew Launay, artist and illustrator Melissa Launay, and three grandchildren; Lee, Lana, Nicolas & Samuel.

Fiction 
The New Shining White Murder
A Corpse in Camera
Death and Still Life
The Scream
The Premonition
The Link
The Unborn
Catacomb
Ouija
The Black Hotel
The Girl with a Peppermint Taste
The Innocence Has Gone, Daddy
The Snake Orchards
The Medusa Horror
The Latchkey Children (hard & paperback)
The Harlequin’s Son (hard & paperback)
Seance
She Modelled Her Coffin (Linford Mystery Library)
The Two-Way Mirror
The Olive Groves of Alhora (with Maria Isabel Rodriguez)
The Maestro of Alhora (with Maria Isabel Rodriguez)

Non-fiction 
Caviare and After
Dictionary of Contemporaries
Historic Air Disasters
Eat, Drink and Be Sorry
Morocco
Madrid & Southern Spain
The Other You
Bluffers Guide to Antiques (paperback)
The Xenophobe's Guide to the Spanish (Paperback)

Xenophobe's Guides 
French for Xenophobes: Xenophobe's Lingo Learners (paperback)
Spanish for Xenophobes: Xenophobe's Lingo Learners (paperback)
German for Xenophobes: Xenophobe's Lingo Learners (paperback)
Italian for Xenophobes: Xenophobe's Lingo Learners (paperback)

Stage plays 
The Man on a Balcony
The Aimless
Come Into My Bed'Yes, We Have no PyjamasA Farce in his Ear, (with Anthony Marriott)

 Screenplays The Girl With a Peppermint Taste (for Carter DeHaven)Hideous Whispers (for Hammer)Black Hotel (for Hammer)The Latchkey Children (for Joe Manuel Productions)The Harlequin's Son (for Rocket Pictures)

 Radio broadcasts 
Siesta Days, Fiesta Nights.  BBC Radio Four.

 Television The Man on a BalconyIf the Crown Fits series with Robert Morley.

Documentary Film The Chef of the Dorchester'' (Look at Life.)

References 

Living people
French fantasy writers
French male writers
Year of birth missing (living people)